In computer science, a node  of a control-flow graph dominates a node  if every path from the entry node to  must go through . By definition, every node dominates itself.

There are a number of related concepts:

 A node  strictly dominates a node  if  dominates  and  does not equal .
 The immediate dominator or idom of a node  is the unique node that strictly dominates  but does not strictly dominate any other node that strictly dominates . Every node, except the entry node, has an immediate dominator.
It is the set of nodes where 's dominance stops.
 A dominator tree is a tree where each node's children are those nodes it immediately dominates. The start node is the root of the tree.

History 
Dominance was first introduced by Reese T. Prosser in a 1959 paper on analysis of flow diagrams. Prosser did not present an algorithm for computing dominance, which had to wait ten years for Edward S. Lowry and C. W. Medlock. Ron Cytron et al. rekindled interest in dominance in 1989 when they applied it to the problem of efficiently computing  the placement of φ functions, which are used in static single assignment form.

Applications 
Dominators, and dominance frontiers particularly, have applications in compilers for computing static single assignment form. A number of compiler optimizations can also benefit from dominators. The flow graph in this case comprises basic blocks.

Automatic parallelization benefits from postdominance frontiers. This is an efficient method of computing control dependence, which is critical to the analysis.

Memory usage analysis can benefit from the dominator tree to easily find leaks and identify high memory usage.

In hardware systems, dominators are used for computing signal probabilities for test generation, estimating switching activities for power and noise analysis, and selecting cut points in equivalence checking.
In software systems, they are used for reducing the size of the test set in structural testing techniques such as statement and branch coverage.

Algorithms 
Let  be the source node on the Control-flow graph. The dominators of a node  are given by the maximal solution to the following data-flow equations:

 

The dominator of the start node is the start node itself.

An algorithm for the direct solution is:

  // dominator of the start node is the start itself
  Dom(n0) = {n0}
  // for all other nodes, set all nodes as the dominators
  for each n in N - {n0}
      Dom(n) = N;
  // iteratively eliminate nodes that are not dominators
  while changes in any Dom(n)
      for each n in N - {n0}:
          Dom(n) = {n} union with intersection over Dom(p) for all p in pred(n)

The direct solution is quadratic in the number of nodes, or O(n2). Lengauer and Tarjan developed an algorithm which is almost linear, and in practice, except for a few artificial graphs, the algorithm and a simplified version of it are as fast or faster than any other known algorithm for graphs of all sizes and its advantage increases with graph size.

Keith D. Cooper, Timothy J. Harvey, and Ken Kennedy of Rice University describe an algorithm that essentially solves the above data flow equations but uses well engineered data structures to improve performance.

Postdominance 
Analogous to the definition of dominance above, a node z is said to post-dominate a node n if all paths to the exit node of the graph starting at n must go through z. Similarly, the immediate post-dominator of a node n is the postdominator of n that doesn't strictly postdominate any other strict postdominators of n.

See also
 Control-flow graph
 Interval (graph theory)
 Static single assignment form

References

External links
The Machine-SUIF Control Flow Analysis Library

Graph theory
Compiler construction